Perissodus is a genus of cichlids endemic to Lake Tanganyika in Africa. They feed on scales.

Species
There are currently two recognized species in this genus:
 Perissodus eccentricus Liem & D. J. Stewart, 1976
 Perissodus microlepis Boulenger, 1898

References 

 
Perissodini
Cichlid genera
Taxa named by George Albert Boulenger
Taxonomy articles created by Polbot